= Indian pulse export ban, 2006 =

The Indian pulse export ban of 2006 occurred on June 28, 2006, when the finance minister of India declared a ban, with immediate effect, on exports of sugar, pulses and wheat until the next harvest, due to domestic shortages. It will be in force until December 2006. The ban was later extended until March 31, 2007. This has pushed prices up in countries such as Bangladesh and the United States. Some exporters have moved to court to challenge the ban.
